Haverhill railway station was a station in Haverhill, Suffolk, on the Stour Valley Railway, which opened in 1865 and closed in 1967. It was sometimes known as Haverhill North because of a separate station in the town on the Colne Valley and Halstead Railway.

Future
The Cambridge Metro project intends to reopen Haverhill and Linton stations, for a commuter light railway to Cambridge city centre.

References

Disused railway stations in Suffolk
Former Great Eastern Railway stations
Railway stations in Great Britain opened in 1865
Railway stations in Great Britain closed in 1967
Beeching closures in England
Haverhill, Suffolk